Rogner Hotel Tirana (also known as Rogner Europapark) is a luxury hotel located on the Dëshmorët e Kombit Boulevard, south of the main center of Tirana, Albania. Located near the Presidential Palace and some foreign embassies it is a notable location for conferences and media related events. The hotel with its distinctive crescent shape has 136 rooms and is set in Mediterranean style gardens.

References

Hotels in Tirana
Hotels in Albania
Hotels established in 1995
Hotel buildings completed in 1995